The 1996 Iowa Hawkeyes football team represented the University of Iowa in the 1996 NCAA Division I-A football season. Participating as members of the Big Ten Conference, the Hawkeyes played their home games at Kinnick Stadium and were led by coach Hayden Fry.

Schedule

Roster

Rankings

Game summaries

Arizona

Sources: Box score and Game recap

Iowa State

Sources: Box score and Game recap
    
    
    
    
    
    
    
    

Tavian Banks ran for 182 yards and 3 touchdowns as the Hawkeyes defeated the Cyclones for the 14th consecutive time.

Tulsa

Sources: Box score and Game recap

Michigan State

Sources: Box score and Game recap

Indiana

Sources: Box score and Game recap

Penn State

Sources: Box score

    
    
    
    
    
    
    

Highlighted by an electrifying 83-yard punt return touchdown by Tim Dwight (the first of five career punt return touchdowns), the Hawkeyes earned their first road win over a top ten opponent since the 1990 season.

Ohio State

Sources: Box score 

    
    
    
    
    
    
    
    
    
    
    

ESPN's College GameDay visited Iowa City for the first time for this matchup between the #2 Buckeyes (6–0) and #20 Hawkeyes (5–1).

Illinois

Sources: Box score and Game recap

Northwestern

Sources: Box score and Game recap

Wisconsin

Sources: Box score 

    
    
    
    
    

After this shutout at Kinnick Stadium, the Hawkeyes had gone 17–0–1 in an 18-game stretch in the series with the Badgers.

Minnesota

Sources: Box score

Alamo Bowl

Sources: Box score and Game recap

Postseason Awards
Tim Dwight – First-team All-American (All-purpose / kick returners)

Team players in the 1997 NFL Draft

References

Iowa
Iowa Hawkeyes football seasons
Alamo Bowl champion seasons
Iowa Hawkeyes football